Lecanora saligna is a species of crustose lichen in the family Lecanoraceae.

See also
List of Lecanora species

References

Lichens described in 1794
Lichen species
saligna
Taxa named by Heinrich Schrader (botanist)